Roger D. Williams (1856–1925) was an American army officer from the state of Kentucky.

References

Sources 

 "Last Rites for Soldier Today". The Lexington Herald. December 15, 1925. pp. 1, 3.

Further reading 

 "Bloodhounds As Thief Catchers!". The Minneapolis Tribune. September 12, 1897. p. 12.
 "Roosevelt Wants Kentuckians to Join His Mounted Regiment". The Daily Leader. April 27, 1898. p. 4.
 "As Versatile as Roosevelt". The Philadelphia Times. May 1, 1898. p. 3.
 "Soldiers Will Go To Breathitt County on Sunday". The Courier-Journal. May 23, 1903. p. 1.
 "Kentucky General An Indian Fighter". El Paso Herald. October 3, 1916. p. 1.
 "Gen. Roger D. Williams Honorably Discharged". The Evansville Courier. April 12, 1918. p. 10.
 "Youngest Captain in Regular Army / Capt. Roger D. Williams, Jr". Spokane Daily Chronicle. August 26, 1918. p. 16.
 "300 Men Apply for Military Training Camp / Seek Site for Cavalry Troop". The Lexington Herald. May 20, 1923. p. 13.
 "5000 Persons Attend Annual Dog and Pet Show Staged at Woodland Park; Ant Eater Is Among Those Present". The Lexington Herald. August 9, 1924. p. 1.
 "General Williams Proved His Heroism". The Lexington Herald. December 13, 1925. p. 2.
 "Gen. Williams Procured Cannon". "Funeral Tuesday". The Lexington Leader. December 14, 1925. pp. 1, 7.
 "Gen. Roger D. Williams". The Lexington Herald. December 17, 1925. p. 7.

External links 

 "Brig Gen Roger D Williams". Find a Grave. June 8, 2004. Retrieved March 18, 2023.

1856 births
1925 deaths
United States Army officers